List of counties of England and Wales in 1964 by highest point. In 1964 they are more or less the ancient counties, with the addition of the County of London and a number of historic divisions in place as administrative counties: Cambridgeshire into the Isle of Ely and Cambridgeshire; Hampshire into the Isle of Wight and Hampshire; Lincolnshire into the Parts of Holland, Kesteven and Lindsey; Northamptonshire into Soke of Peterborough and Northamptonshire; Suffolk into East and West; Sussex into East and West; and Yorkshire into the East, North and West Ridings.

Footnotes
The foot measurement is derived from the Ordnance Survey metre measurement, multiplied by 3.2808.

References

External links
County tops of the British Isles on Wikishire (by traditional counties)
Hill Bagging

Counties
Counties
Highest points
Historic counties by highest point
Highest points
 
 
Counties of England and Wales